Bidhan Lama (विधान लामा) is a Nepalese taekwondo practitioner who competed in the −50 kg division.
He won the first Medal at Asian Game from Nepal. He won bronze medals at the 1986 Asian Games, 1987 World Taekwondo Championships and at the 1988 Summer Olympics, where taekwondo was then an exhibition event. He is the only sports person from Nepal to win an Olympic medal.

Bidhan Lama is the most successful and historical medal winning athlete of Nepali sports. Lama defeated the U.K. Ebenezer Ghansah (GBR) in the first fight in the 1988 Summer Olympics, defeated the Germans Choi Chan-ok (FRG) in the quarter-final and defeated the Americans Juan Moreno (USA)  in the Semi-final to give Nepal the bronze medal. Although this is a demonstration game, this is a historic medal for Nepal.

Lama won the first and historic silver medal for Nepal in the 1988 Asian Taekwondo Championships. At that time, the biggest and most historic medal of Nepali Taekwondo was the first medal.

References

Living people
Nepalese male taekwondo practitioners
Olympic taekwondo practitioners of Nepal
Taekwondo practitioners at the 1988 Summer Olympics
Asian Games medalists in taekwondo
Taekwondo practitioners at the 1986 Asian Games
Asian Games bronze medalists for Nepal
Medalists at the 1986 Asian Games
People from Kavrepalanchok District
Year of birth missing (living people)
World Taekwondo Championships medalists